The Lady Is Willing is a 1934 British comedy film directed by Gilbert Miller and starring Leslie Howard (as Mr. Leslie Howard).

The film was unsuccessful, though it received some positive feedbacks; Mordaunt Hall wrote for The New York Times:

Plot
Set in France, private detective Albert Latour is employed by three men who aim to take revenge on the man responsible for a failed investment. Realising that the man's wife is wealthy, Latour kidnaps her in order to hold a ransom. The matter gets complicated when he finds himself falling in love with her.

Cast
Leslie Howard as Albert Latour (as Mr. Leslie Howard)
Cedric Hardwicke as Gustav Dupont
Binnie Barnes as Helene Dupont
Nigel Playfair as Professor Menard (as Sir Nigel Playfair)
Nigel Bruce as Welton
W. Graham Brown as Monsieur Pignolet (as Graham Browne)
Kendall Lee as Valerie 
Claud Allister as Brevin
Arthur Howard as Dr. Germont

See also
List of British films of 1934

References

External links

British comedy films
British films based on plays
Films based on works by Louis Verneuil
Films set in France
Columbia Pictures films
British black-and-white films
Films about kidnapping
1934 comedy films
Films shot at Imperial Studios, Elstree
1930s British films
1930s English-language films
English-language comedy films